İslamlar is a village in Dikili district of İzmir Province, Turkey.  It is situated to the east of Turkish state highway . The population of the village is 266  as of 2011.

References

Villages in Dikili District